Frederick David Morgan   (born 6 October 1937) is a cricket administrator who is the former president of the International Cricket Council. He had previously held positions as chairman of the England and Wales Cricket Board and Glamorgan County Cricket Club.

Morgan was born in Tredegar.  In 1993 he succeeded Tony Lewis as Chairman of Glamorgan County Cricket Club, a position he held until 1997 when he joined the ECB board as deputy chairman to Lord MacLaurin. After MacLaurin stood down from the role in 2002, Morgan stood for election. In October 2002 he was elected the new chairman, gaining 11 votes to the eight of opposing candidate, Mike Soper. In 2004 and 2006 he was re-elected to this position without opposition.

In 2007 Morgan was nominated for the presidency of the ICC, he and opposing candidate Sharad Pawar received an equal number of votes so an agreement was reached enabling both men to serve as president. Morgan began his role in June 2008 and served for two years before being succeeded by Pawar in 2010. He is the President of Marylebone Cricket Club for 2014/5.

In 2008 Morgan was awarded the OBE for his services to cricket.

In the business world Morgan was commercial director of European Electrical Steels until 2001.

References

External links
Cricinfo Profile
ECB Factfile

1937 births
Living people
Welsh cricket administrators
Presidents of the International Cricket Council
Presidents of the Marylebone Cricket Club
Officers of the Order of the British Empire
Deputy Lieutenants of Gwent
Sportspeople from Tredegar